Jennifer Fielder is an American politician who most recently served as a Republican serving in the Montana Senate.

Political career
Fielder was first elected to the state senate in 2012. At the time she lived in Thompson Falls and represented several counties in northwest Montana, including Sanders, Mineral, and western Missoula. After serving the maximum of two terms, Fielder was succeeded in her position by fellow Republican Bob Brown. She was elected to the Montana Public Service Commission in 2020.

Committees
Fielder has served on the Environmental Quality Council and Water Policy committees in an interim fashion.

Legislative work

Fielder has advocated the transfer of federal public lands to state governments. While some organizations see the transfer as paving the way for a sell off of public lands, Fielder says it is simply intended to provide better public access.

Career

Fielder is a former ski instructor and consultant, according to her website.

References

External links
 Fielder's Official Senate Web Page

External links

Living people
Republican Party Montana state senators
Women state legislators in Montana
21st-century American politicians
21st-century American women politicians
People from Thompson Falls, Montana
Year of birth missing (living people)